Live on Forever is the fifth studio album by American rock band The Afters, released on September 9, 2016, through Fair Trade/Columbia.  "Live on Forever", the title track from that album, placed top 5 on the Billboard Christian Hot AC radio chart as well as top 10 on the Billboard National Christian Audience chart.
Chris Major of The Christian Beat describes the work as a "beautiful and inspiring album full of encouragement and hope".

Track listing

Singles

Awards and nominations 

GMA Dove Awards

References

External links 
 

The Afters albums
2016 albums